Honeoye Lake Boat Launch State Park is a  state park located along the southeastern shore of Honeoye Lake, one of New York's Finger Lakes. The park is located in Ontario County off East Lake Road, and offers a boat launch in addition to facilitating lake access for fishing and ice fishing.

See also
 List of New York state parks

References

External links
 New York State Parks: Honeoye Lake Boat Launch State Park

State parks of New York (state)
Parks in Ontario County, New York